Lotte Haidegger (15 June 1925 – 14 February 2004) was an Austrian athlete. She competed in the women's discus throw at the 1948 Summer Olympics and the 1952 Summer Olympics.

Haidegger was married to Felix Würth, a fellow Olympian. She died in Puslinch, Ontario on 14 February 2004, at the age of 78.

References

External links
 

1925 births
2004 deaths
Place of birth missing
Athletes (track and field) at the 1948 Summer Olympics
Athletes (track and field) at the 1952 Summer Olympics
Austrian female discus throwers
Olympic athletes of Austria